Marriage in France may be performed by civil authorities; religious weddings are not recognized by law. The minimum age to get married is 18.

Marriage in France is the institution that allows two people to unite to live together and start a family.

Article 143 of the Civil Code of the French (Code civil) governs civil marriage and consecrated the couple by law. Since 1999, it exists with the Rules of Cohabitation (concubinage) and the Civil Solidarity Pact (PACS).

Religious organizations that organize only religious marriages are not recognized by the law.

See also
 Same-sex marriage in France
 Posthumous marriage in France

References